The 1957 Campeon de Campeones is the 16th Mexican Super Cup football one-leg  match, played on May 5, 1957. It was played by Primera División de México league winners C.D. Guadalajara and Copa México winners Zacatepec. The match was held at the Olympic Stadium of Mexico City.

Match details

See also 
 Campeón de Campeones
 Liga MX
 Copa MX

References

Campeón de Campeones
May 1957 sports events in Mexico